Andrew Hutchinson House was a historic home located in downtown Evansville, Indiana. It was built in 1851. It has been demolished.

It was listed on the National Register of Historic Places in 1982 and delisted in 1991.

References

Former National Register of Historic Places in Indiana
Houses on the National Register of Historic Places in Indiana
Houses completed in 1851
Houses in Evansville, Indiana
National Register of Historic Places in Evansville, Indiana